Andrei Lvovich Zaikin (born 15 August 1968 in Tashkent; died 1 June 1993 in Saint Petersburg) was a Russian-Uzbekistani football player.

External links
 

1968 births
Sportspeople from Tashkent
1993 deaths
Pakhtakor Tashkent FK players
Soviet footballers
Uzbekistani footballers
FC SKA Rostov-on-Don players
Russian footballers
FC Zenit Saint Petersburg players
Russian Premier League players
FK Neftchi Farg'ona players
Russian expatriate footballers
Expatriate footballers in Uzbekistan
Association football goalkeepers